This discography of Candy Dulfer contains her own singles and albums, and also the other artists' albums for which she recorded.

Studio albums

Collaborative albums

Compilation albums

Live albums

Singles

Guest appearances
I Didn't Ask (1981) of Hans Dulfer & De Perikels
Too Busy (1984) of Rosa King & Upside Down
State of Mind (1985) of City-and-State
Red Skies (1985) of Boom Boom Mancini
Timboektoe (1986) of Think Big
L'amour qui fait boum (1988) of Sjako!
Graffiti Bridge (1989) of Prince
Hot Piece of Merchandise (1989) of Urban Heroes
Hooks (1989) of Herman Brood & His Wild Romance
Pandemonium (1990) of The Time
Midnight Man (1990) of René Froger
What You See Is What You Sweat (1991) of Aretha Franklin
Hymns to the Silence (1991) of Van Morrison
Life on Planet Groove (1992) of Maceo Parker
Sweet Hellos & Sad Goodbyes (1992) of René Froger
Mr. Blue (1993) of René Klijn
Too Long in Exile (1993) of Van Morrison
Empowered (1993) of Boom Boom Mancini
Live in Concert (1993) of René Froger
A Night in San Francisco (1993) of Van Morrison
Hips' First (1994) of Hips
Big Boy (1994) of Hans Dulfer
The Best of Rosa King (1995) of Rosa King & Upside Down
Dig! (1996) of Hans Dulfer
O'beat (1996) of D'wys
Total Touch (1996) of Total Touch
 'Tis The Season (1997) of various artists
50 (1997) of Herman Brood
No Exit (1998) of Blondie
Bodymusic (1998) of Saskia Laroo
Skin Deep! (1998) of Hans Dulfer
Oog in oog – Live in Ahoy (2001) of Bløf
Some Love (2001) of Soulvation
Verschil moet er zijn (2002) of Brainpower
One Nite Alone... Live! (2002) of Prince
Xpectation (2003) of Prince
Maceo by Maceo (2003) of Maceo Parker
Jack O' The Green (2003) of Jools Holland
Musicology (2004) of Prince
School's In! (2005) of Maceo Parker
See You As I Do (2005) of Trijntje Oosterhuis
3121 (2006) of Prince
Zangzaag (2007) of Kasper van Kooten
Meer dan ooit (2007) of Edsilia Rombley
ABC of Romance (2007) of Moon Baker
Finally (2007) of Berget Lewis
Live at Knebworth 1990 (2021) of Pink Floyd
Pick up the Pieces future mix 92 featuring King MC (1993)

References

 
Jazz discographies
Discographies of Dutch artists